The 2011 SummerSlam was the 24th annual SummerSlam professional wrestling pay-per-view (PPV) event produced by WWE. It was held for wrestlers from the promotion's Raw and SmackDown brand divisions. The event took place on August 14, 2011, at Staples Center in Los Angeles, California for the third consecutive year. It was the final WWE pay-per-view event held before the dissolution of the original brand extension, which was introduced in March 2002, although the brand split would be reintroduced in July 2016.

The card consisted of eight matches, including one on the pre-show. In the main event, WWE Champion CM Punk defeated WWE Champion John Cena to become the Undisputed WWE Champion with Triple H as the special guest referee, after which, Alberto Del Rio cashed in his Money in the Bank briefcase and defeated CM Punk to win the WWE Championship. In another prominent match, Randy Orton defeated Christian in a No Holds Barred match to regain the World Heavyweight Championship. SummerSlam attracted a sellout crowd of 17,404 fans at Staples Center in Los Angeles, grossing more than $1 million, marking the highest grossing SummerSlam held at Staples Center. The event garnered 296,000 pay-per-view buys, down from 350,000 buys the previous year.

Production

Background
SummerSlam is an annual pay-per-view (PPV), produced every summer by WWE since 1988—in April 2011, the promotion ceased going by its full name of World Wrestling Entertainment, with "WWE" becoming an orphaned initialism. Dubbed "The Biggest Party of the Summer," it is one of the promotion's original four pay-per-views, along with WrestleMania, SummerSlam, and Survivor Series, referred to as the "Big Four". It has since become considered WWE's second biggest event of the year behind WrestleMania. The 2011 event was the 24th event in the SummerSlam chronology and was scheduled to be held on August 14, 2011, at Staples Center in Los Angeles, California for the third consecutive year. It featured wrestlers from the Raw and SmackDown brands.

Much like the previous year's SummerSlam, WWE promoted the event with its SummerSlam Axxess fan convention, held at the Nokia Plaza in LA Live on August 13 and 14. R&B singer Cee Lo Green performed both "'Bright Lights Bigger City", the official theme song for the event, and his hit "'Forget You" during the broadcast. The commentators for this event were Michael Cole, Jerry Lawler and Booker T.

Storylines
The professional wrestling matches at SummerSlam featured professional wrestlers performing as characters in scripted events pre-determined by the hosting promotion, WWE. Storylines between the characters were produced on WWE's weekly television shows Raw and SmackDown with the Raw and SmackDown brands—storyline divisions in which WWE assigned its employees to different programs.

The main feud headed into SummerSlam from the SmackDown brand was between Christian and Randy Orton, over Christian's World Heavyweight Championship. At Extreme Rules in May, Christian defeated Alberto Del Rio in a ladder match to win the vacant World Heavyweight Championship for the first time, only to lose it to Orton on the May 6 episode of SmackDown. After two unsuccessful attempts at regaining the title from Orton at the Over the Limit and Capitol Punishment pay-per-views, Christian finally won the championship for the second time at the Money in the Bank event in July, after he spat in Orton's face, provoking the latter to kick Christian in the groin and get himself disqualified; as per pre-match stipulations enacted by Christian, he won the title. On the July 29 episode of SmackDown, the new Chief Operating Officer of WWE, Triple H, scheduled a title defense by Christian against Orton in a No Holds Barred match at SummerSlam.

The main event from the Raw brand for SummerSlam would pit John Cena against CM Punk for the WWE Championship. In the weeks leading to the Money in the Bank pay-per-view in July on Raw, Punk announced the expiration of his WWE contract on the night of the Money in the Bank, en route lambasting WWE for failing to promote him as the "best wrestler in the world", and threatened some high authority figures like WWE Chairman, Vince McMahon, of defeating Cena and leaving WWE with the championship. At Money in the Bank, Punk pinned Cena to win the title, and even after McMahon tried to have Alberto Del Rio – who had won the Raw Money in the Bank briefcase earlier that night – cash in his contract against Punk. The latter nevertheless left the arena with the championship. The following night on Raw, McMahon dismissed Punk's claim to the title, and announced an 8-man tournament to decide the new WWE Champion. Also, on the same night, Triple H relieved McMahon of his duties, and assumed control over WWE as the Chief Operating Officer just as the chairman was about to fire Cena. On the July 25 edition of Raw, Rey Mysterio defeated The Miz in the finals to become the WWE Champion but lost it later on the same night against Cena. After the match, Punk returned to WWE with the title belt he had won at Money in the Bank, initiating a title dispute between Cena and Punk. As they were now two wrestlers with a claim to the WWE Championship, a one-on-one match between Punk and Cena was scheduled for SummerSlam to determine the undisputed WWE Champion. On the August 8 episode of Raw, Triple H made himself the special guest referee for the Undisputed WWE Championship match.

The Divas rivalry heading into SummerSlam was between Kelly Kelly and Beth Phoenix over the WWE Divas Championship. On the August 1 edition of Raw, Phoenix won a Divas battle royal to become the #1 Contender for the Kelly's Divas Championship at SummerSlam. Phoenix turned heel after her victory by attacking Kelly in and out of the ring, and later told Kelly that "her days as the cute, blonde little bimbo are over." On the following week, Phoenix defeated Eve Torres in singles action, but was attacked by Kelly after the match.

Event

Preliminary matches
The first match was a six-man tag team match pitting Kofi Kingston, John Morrison and Rey Mysterio against The Miz, R-Truth and Alberto Del Rio. Mysterio performed a 619 followed by a slingshot Splash on R-Truth to win the match.

Next, Sheamus faced off against Mark Henry. Sheamus executed a Brogue Kick on Henry but Henry rolled out of the ring. Henry tackled Sheamus through the barricade. Sheamus was counted out, giving Henry the win.

In the next match, Kelly Kelly defended the WWE Divas Championship against Beth Phoenix. Phoenix attempted a Glam Slam on Kelly but Kelly countered the move into a Roll Up to retain the title.

Next, Wade Barrett faced Daniel Bryan. Barrett executed Wasteland to win the match.

Main event matches
In the SmackDown main event, Christian defended the World Heavyweight Championship against Randy Orton in a No Holds Barred match. Before the match, Christian revealed that Edge will be in his corner for the match, but Edge told Christian that he was disappointed with him and walked away. During the match, Christian attempted an RKO through a broadcast table on Orton but Orton countered the move into an RKO through the broadcast table on Christian. Christian executed a KillSwitch on Orton for a near-fall. Orton performed a Snap Scoop Powerslam through a table on Christian and an Elevated DDT onto a Trash Can. Christian attempted a Sunset Flip out of the corner but Orton countered the move into an RKO on the steel steps to win the title.

In the Raw main event, John Cena wrestled CM Punk to determine the undisputed WWE Champion. Triple H served as guest referee. Cena executed the Attitude Adjustment for a near-fall. Punk performed a GTS on Cena for a near-fall. Punk executed a GTS to win the title, despite Cena's foot being on the bottom rope.

As Punk celebrated his WWE Championship win, Kevin Nash returned and attacked Punk with a Jackknife Powerbomb. Immediately afterwards Alberto Del Rio appeared and cashed in his Money in  the Bank contract. Del Rio performed a Step Up Enziguiri on Punk to win the title.

Aftermath
In March 2002, WWE initiated the brand extension, which promoted its core business of professional wrestling through such brands, named after their two major television shows, Raw and SmackDown. On the August 29 episode of Raw, it was announced that performers from Raw and SmackDown were no longer exclusive to their respective brand. Subsequentely, championships previously exclusive to one show or the other were available for wrestlers from any show to compete for; this would mark the end of the brand extension, as all programming and live events featured the full WWE roster. In turn, SummerSlam 2011 was the last pay-per-view to occur under the first brand split. In 2013, Stephanie McMahon revealed in an interview with Advertising Age that WWE's decision to end the brand extension was due to wanting their content to flow across television and online platforms. However, the brand split was reintroduced in July 2016, when SmackDown began broadcasting live on Tuesdays.

Results

References

External links
WWE Live Tour: SummerSlam website
Official SummerSlam minisite
Official SummerSlam site

2011
Professional wrestling in Los Angeles
2011 in California
Events in Los Angeles
2011 WWE pay-per-view events
August 2011 events in the United States